The Flag of Kirkcudbrightshire is the flag of the county and Stewartry of Kirkcudbright. It was registered with the Flag Institute as the flag of the county in June 2016 after the Lord Lieutenant petitioned the Lord Lyon.

Design
It was designed by the Flag Institute's Philip Tibbetts. The green and white emblem represents the checked cloth used to count taxes by the Stewards of the Lords of Galloway with the St Cuthbert's cross sitting on top. The town and county of Kirkcudbright were named after the saint, with an early rendition of the name being Kilcudbrit, derived from the Scots Gaelic Cille Chuithbeirt (Chapel of Cuthbert). The Anglo-Saxon saint's remains were kept here for seven years between exhumation at Lindisfarne and re-interment at Chester-le-Street. A pectoral cross was found on the saint's body when his tomb was opened in the nineteenth century. The original is on display in Durham Cathedral where he was eventually buried. That cross is also depicted on the flag of County Durham.

References

External links
People of the Stewartry given their own flag ahead of Queen's 90th birthday celebrations – Daily Record

Flag
Kirkcudbrightshire
Flags introduced in 2016
Flags with crosses